Remmelt de Boer (born 1 August 1942, in Steenwijk) is a former Dutch politician and educator. As a member of the ChristianUnion (ChristenUnie) he was a member of the Senate from 2007 to 2011.

De Boer was also a member of the municipal council as well as an alderman of Kampen for the Reformed Political League (Gereformeerd Politiek Verbond) and later its successor the ChristianUnion.

References 
  Parlement.com biography

1942 births
Living people
Aldermen in Overijssel
Christian Union (Netherlands) politicians
21st-century Dutch politicians
Dutch educators
Members of the Senate (Netherlands)
Municipal councillors in Overijssel
People from Kampen, Overijssel
People from Steenwijkerland
Reformed Churches (Liberated) Christians from the Netherlands
Reformed Political League politicians